Arriola is a Lima Metro station on Line 1. The station is located between La Cultura and Gamarra. It was opened on 11 July 2011 as part of the extension of the line from Atocongo to Miguel Grau. The full revenue service started on 3 January 2012.

References

Lima Metro stations
2011 establishments in Peru
Railway stations opened in 2011